The State Register of Heritage Places is maintained by the Heritage Council of Western Australia. , 55 places are heritage-listed in the Shire of Trayning, of which four are on the State Register of Heritage Places.

List
The Western Australian State Register of Heritage Places, lists the following four state registered places within the Shire of Trayning:

References

Trayning
Trayning
Shire of Trayning